Schwa with tilde (Ә̃ ә̃; italics: Ә̃ ә̃) is a letter of the Cyrillic script.

Schwa with tilde is used only in the alphabet of the Khinalug language where it represents the nasalized near-open front unrounded vowel /æ̃/.

Similar and related characters

 Ə: Latin letter schwa, used in Azerbaijani
 Ә: Cyrillic letter schwa

See also
Cyrillic characters in Unicode

References

Cyrillic letters with diacritics
Letters with tilde